"Sweet and Innocent" is a song written by Rick Hall and Billy Sherrill, first recorded by Roy Orbison in 1958. It was released as the B-side to the single, "Seems to Me".

The Osmonds recording
In 1970, pop singing group The Osmonds recorded a substantially reworked version of the song with Donny handling the lead vocals, and it was billed as his first solo single release. The lyrics were shifted from Orbison's original words being a compliment to a young woman, to Osmond's remake being repulsed by her behavior. Donny took the song to No. 7 on the Billboard Hot 100 singles chart on June 5, 1971, and number 32 for all of 1971.  It was certified Gold by the RIAA on August 30, 1971.

Charts

Certifications

References

1958 songs
1958 singles
1971 singles
Roy Orbison songs
The Osmonds songs
Songs written by Billy Sherrill
Songs written by Rick Hall
MGM Records singles
RCA Victor singles